Sagolia is a small place under Agomani Block in Dhubri district of Assam, India. The place exactly located in between Assam and West Bengal border. Sagolia is a busy commercial business place. Here is also a State Bank of India branch. This place is famous for the Bihu Program. Both Assamese (Goalpariya dialect) speakers and Bengali speakers form plurality here. This was the region of the Koch kingdom.

Cities and towns in Dhubri district